Saugerties, New York may refer to:

Saugerties, New York, in Ulster County, U.S.
Saugerties (village), New York
Saugerties Light, a lighthouse on the Hudson River
Saugerties South, New York
West Saugerties, New York